The Waterstones Debut Fiction Prize, established in 2022, is an annual literary award presented by Waterstones to the best debut fiction published in the previous 12 months. The award is intended to "celebrate[] the very best fresh voices in fiction and share[] the joy and magic of discovering new authors." Fictional books of all genres are considered, "including genre fiction such as crime, sci-fi and fantasy as well as fiction in translation."

Award winners receive £5,000 pounds and "the backing of all Waterstones shops."

Recipients

References 

English literary awards
Awards established in 2022
2022 establishments in the United Kingdom